Geoffrey Wayne Rice  (born 1946) is a New Zealand historian. He is an emeritus professor of history at the University of Canterbury, Christchurch. He joined the staff in 1973, and served as head of the School of History from 2006 to 2011, before retiring in 2012.

Rice graduated MA in 1970 and was subsequently the first person to be awarded a history PhD by the University of Canterbury in 1974. He served as the foundation secretary of the New Zealand Historical Association from 1978 to 1981, and was secretary of the Canterbury Historical Association from 1982 to 2007. He has been secretary of the Canterbury History Foundation since 2012. Rice has also been a member of the Royal Society of New Zealand, and is a fellow of the Royal Historical Society, London. He was general editor for the 2nd edition of the Oxford History of New Zealand. Since 1986 he has organised and judged the J. M. Sherrard Award in New Zealand Local and Regional History.

Rice is best known for his detailed studies of the 1918 influenza pandemic and its effect on New Zealand and Japan, as well as his studies of the local history of Christchurch. His book Black November (1988; second edition 2005) was the first country-level study of the 1918 influenza pandemic based on individual death records. This book assisted the New Zealand Ministry of Health in preparing its current Influenza Pandemic Plan, and Rice has been invited to give educational presentations on the flu to Ministry of Health staff. Data from his research has been used in several recent epidemiological studies. A condensed and updated version of Black November was published in 2017 as Black Flu 1918: the story of New Zealand’s worst public health disaster.

Rice is also known for his books on Christchurch's history and that of its neighbouring port, Lyttelton. Rice has also written books and articles on the Fourth Earl of Rochford and Heaton Rhodes, as well as some of the Christchurch heritage lost during the 2011 Christchurch earthquake and its aftershocks. His precinct history of Victoria Square, a public space in Christchurch, was published in 2014.

In November 2019 Rice unveiled the 1918 Influenza Pandemic Memorial Plaque at Pukeahu Park alongside the Prime Minister of New Zealand, Jacinda Ardern.

In the 2021 New Year Honours, Rice was appointed an Officer of the New Zealand Order of Merit, for services to historical research and tertiary education.

Books
All Fall Down: Christchurch's Lost Chimneys, (Canterbury University Press, 2011), 
Ambulances and First Aid: St John in Christchurch 1885–1987, (The Order of St John Christchurch, 1994) 
Black November: The 1918 influenza pandemic in New Zealand, (with assistance from Linda Bryder), (Canterbury University Press, 2005, 2nd edition), 
Christchurch Changing: An illustrated history, (Canterbury University Press, 1st Ed. 1999, 2nd Ed. 2008) 
Christchurch Crimes 1850 – 75: Scandal and skullduggery in port and town, (Canterbury University Press, 2012) 
Christchurch Crimes and Scandals 1876 – 99, (Canterbury University Press, 2013) 
Christchurch in the Nineties: A Chronology, (Canterbury University Press, 2002) 
Heaton Rhodes of Otahuna, (Canterbury University Press, 2nd Ed. 2008) 
The Life of the Fourth Earl of Rochford: Eighteenth-century Anglo-Dutch Courtier, Diplomat and Statesman, (Edwin Mellen Press, 2010) 
Lyttelton: Port and Town: an illustrated history, (Canterbury University Press, 2004) 
Rhodes on Cashmere: a history of the Rhodes Memorial Convalescent Home, (Hawthorne Press, 2005) 
Victoria Square: Cradle of Christchurch, (Canterbury University Press, 2014) 
Cricketing Colonists: The Brittan Brothers in Early Canterbury, (with assistance from Frances Ryman), (Canterbury University Press, 2015) 
That Terrible Time: Eye-witness accounts of the 1918 influenza pandemic in New Zealand, (Hawthorne Press, 2018) 
A Scientific Welsh Eye Surgeon: the short life of Llewellyn Powell MD (1843–79), Christchurch’s First Public Health Medical Officer (Christchurch, Hawthorne Press and Cotter Medical History Trust, 2020) 
The Life of Leslie Averill MD: First into Le Quesnoy: Battles, Babies and Boardrooms with Colin Averill (Christchurch: Dorincourt Press, 2018)

Booklets
 Why did Wellington suffer nearly double the death-rate of Christchurch in the 1918 influenza pandemic? The 2018 Jim Gardner Memorial Lecture; (Christchurch, Canterbury History Foundation, 2018), 32 pp. .
 Christchurch’s Sensational Styche Case of 1900: a notable New Zealand Appeals precedent (Christchurch, Hawthorne Press, 2020), 31 pp. 
 Wellington’s Mysterious ‘Baron’ Mollwo: the Thalio-Histrionic Elocutionary Lecturer (Christchurch, Hawthorne Press, 2020), 33 pp. 
 Surgery in Nineteenth Century Christchurch, New Zealand, 1850–1900 (Christchurch, Hawthorne Press & Cotter Medical History Trust, 2020), 38 pp. 
 Chemists and Druggists in Early Christchurch and Lyttelton, 1850s to 1880s (Christchurch, Hawthorne Press & Cotter Medical History Trust, 2020), 22 pp. 
 The Christchurch Trials and Tribulations of Dr Adam Mickle, 1890–91 (Christchurch, Hawthorne Press, 2020), 15 pp. 
 Christchurch’s Curious Coccyx Case of 1899: Dr Arthur De Renzi’s surgery on Mrs Sarah Walmsley (Christchurch, Hawthorne Press, 2020), 25 pp. 
 The Notorious Dr Russell of Tristram House: an American Creole abortionist in Christchurch, New Zealand, 1880–1915 (Christchurch, Hawthorne Press, 2020), 67 pp.

References

20th-century New Zealand historians
Academic staff of the University of Canterbury
Living people
1946 births
People from Taumarunui
Officers of the New Zealand Order of Merit
Fellows of the Royal Historical Society
20th-century New Zealand male writers
21st-century New Zealand historians
21st-century New Zealand male writers